Gianfranco Pagliarulo (born 16 September 1949) is an Italian politician, President of National Association of Italian Partisans since 2020.

Biography 
Pagliarulo has been elected Senator at the 2001 Italian political election, being one of the two MP elected with the Party of Italian Communists that year.

In November 2017, Pagliarulo was appointed Vicepresident of the National Association of Italian Partisans, under the guidance of Carla Nespolo. In October 2020, after Nespolo's death, Pagliarulo was elected President of ANPI.

References

External links 
Files about his parliamentary activities (in Italian): XIV legislature.

1949 births
Living people
People from Bari
Italian Communist Party politicians
Communist Refoundation Party politicians
Party of Italian Communists politicians
Democratic Party (Italy) politicians
Senators of Legislature XIV of Italy
Politicians of Apulia
20th-century Italian politicians
21st-century Italian politicians